Forrest Sawyer (born April 19, 1949) is an American broadcast journalist. Sawyer worked 11 years with ABC News, where he frequently anchored ABC World News Tonight and Nightline and reported for all ABC News broadcasts. He anchored the newsmagazines "Day One" and "Turning Point"  He recorded stories from all over the globe, and earned awards for his reports and documentaries, including Emmy Awards in 1992, 1993, and 1994.  He left ABC News in 1999 to become a news anchor for both NBC and its cable counterpart, MSNBC, where he was a regular substitute for Brian Williams as anchor for The News with Brian Williams.  He left NBC News in 2005 to become founder and president of Freefall Productions, where he produces documentaries and serves as a media strategist and guest lecturer.

Early years
Sawyer was born and reared in Lakeland, Florida, where he graduated from Kathleen High School. He was a member of Alpha Tau Omega at the University of Florida, where he earned a Bachelor's degree in Eastern Philosophy and World Religions and a Master's degree in Education.

Professional career
After starting in radio, Sawyer worked as newsman and news director at WAAB in Worcester for a short period in 1973, and left for a news job at WVBF in Boston for year or so, before moving to Television.  One of the WAAB newsmen, John Gallagher, said Sawyer had the sharpest mind and quickest wit he’d ever seen in a radio newsman and could write the news and commentary, as fast he could speak it.  After falling out with WAAB/WAAF owner George Gray, he moved to on air at WVBF in Boston for a year, then moving to tv.  (in a fit of emotion, when he was fired, or quit (still disputed according to WAAB newsman Mike Marcy) he left the WAAB studios calling owner George Gray a "chubby little clown"....the nickname stayed with employees until 4 years later when the radio stations were sold to a group headed by Dick Ferguson, Steve Marx and Bob Williams.     A few years later, Sawyer was invited to host a program called "World in Review" for Georgia Public Television, where world events in the news each week were looked at in depth by a panel of academic experts.  The news director of Atlanta's then-CBS affiliate saw how talented he was and hired him; he was still full-time at his radio job.  Sawyer moved into commercial television with Atlanta's WAGA-TV where he shared a Peabody Award in 1982 for Paradise Saved, a documentary on Cumberland Island. Sawyer, Don Smith, and photographer George Gentry were cited for a documentary in which viewers were "treated to a quality of visual beauty not often seen on television and, at the same time, were informed, enlightened, and challenged concerning the problems of retaining a great natural heritage and a diminishing resource—the unspoiled beauty of the Atlantic Coast."

From August 1985 to August 1986, Sawyer and Maria Shriver were anchors of The CBS Morning News. Sawyer stayed with CBS until 1987. He joined ABC in 1988 as anchorman of ABC World News This Morning and also hosted "World News Sunday"  and "Day One." He hosted Justice Files on The Discovery Channel in the early 1990s.  Sawyer filed the first in-depth network report on the 1996 Mount Everest disaster, was the first reporter to gain access to the KGB's files on Lee Harvey Oswald, and filed history's first live television report from a battlefield during the First Gulf War. Sawyer also served as a regular substitute anchor on the ABC News programs ABC World News Tonight and Nightline before leaving ABC and joining NBC.

In addition to his Peabody Award, he has received a total of seven National Emmy Awards, two Sigma Delta Chi Awards, two Edward R. Murrow Awards, an Associated Press Award, an Ohio State Award, an Ark Award and two American Psychological Association Awards.

Sawyer played himself as moderator in "The Debate" an episode of The West Wing which aired live and was dedicated solely to a debate between two fictitious presidential candidates.

He was a guest speaker at the American Association of Community Colleges Conference in Long Beach, CA, during April 2006 and was keynote speaker on May 11, 2007 at the University of California, Santa Barbara, at a conference titled, "The Future of Multi-Media Digital News and Cultural Networks."

In late 2007, while filming a documentary in Tanzania, Sawyer survived a helicopter crash in which he suffered a serious knee injury before hiking miles with other survivors to safety.  His recent media appearances include anchoring the July 19, 2008 edition of the CBS Evening News. and reporting the 2009 Frontline documentary "Ten Trillion and Counting," a journey through the politics behind the national debt.

References

External links

Yahoo! TV

1949 births
American television news anchors
American television reporters and correspondents
Emmy Award winners
Living people
Peabody Award winners
University of Florida College of Education alumni
People from Lakeland, Florida
ABC News personalities
CBS News people
60 Minutes correspondents
University of Florida College of Liberal Arts and Sciences alumni